Tumisang Orebonye (born 26 March 1996) is a Botswana footballerwho is currently playing for USM Alger in the Algerian Ligue Professionnelle 1 and the Botswana national football team.

Carrer
In 2023, he joined USM Alger.

Honours

Club
 Township Rollers
Botswana Premier League:1
2018-19

Individual
FUB Young Player of the Season: 2017
Mascom Top 8 Cup Top Goalscorer: 2019

References

External links
 

1996 births
Living people
Botswana footballers
Motlakase Power Dynamos players
Gaborone United S.C. players
Township Rollers F.C. players
Association football forwards
Algerian Ligue Professionnelle 1 players
USM Alger players
Expatriate footballers in Algeria